Pelican Narrows Airport  is located  north north-east of Pelican Narrows, Saskatchewan, Canada.

Pelican Narrows Airport was opened in the 1980s. It contains no lights or buildings and has a gravel airstrip.

See also 
 List of airports in Saskatchewan
 Pelican Narrows Water Aerodrome

References 

Registered aerodromes in Saskatchewan